Bob Hiensch (born 17 May 1948, Hilversum) is the current ambassador-at-large at the Ministry of Foreign Affairs of the Netherlands. From 2007 until 2012, he was the ambassador to the Republic of India and non-resident Dutch ambassador to Bhutan and Nepal, and before that, from 2003 to 2007, he was the Dutch ambassador to Israel.

References

1948 births
Living people
Ambassadors of the Netherlands to India
Ambassadors of the Netherlands to Nepal
Ambassadors of the Netherlands to Bhutan
Ambassadors of the Netherlands to Israel
People from Hilversum
University of Amsterdam alumni
Flight attendants